Miami Township is one of fourteen townships in Cass County, Indiana. As of the 2010 census, its population was 1,292.

History
Miami Township was organized in 1831. It was named after the Miami people who once inhabited the area.

Geography

Unincorporated towns
 Danes
 Lewisburg
 Miami Bend
 New Waverly
 Old Adamsboro
(This list is based on USGS data and may include former settlements.)

Adjacent townships
 Adams (north)
 Jefferson Township, Miami County (northeast)
 Peru Township, Miami County (east)
 Tipton (south)
 Washington (southwest)
 Clay (west)
 Eel (west)

Major highways
  U.S. Route 24

Cemeteries
The township contains four cemeteries: Ever Rest Memorial Gardens, Miami, Mount Calvary and Williams.

References
 United States Census Bureau cartographic boundary files
 U.S. Board on Geographic Names

External links

 Indiana Township Association
 United Township Association of Indiana

Townships in Cass County, Indiana
Townships in Indiana
1831 establishments in Indiana
Populated places established in 1831